The bridges in New Zealand are many and varied but only date back to the beginning of European settlement in the mid 19th century.

Road bridges
In 2011 there were 4,024 bridges on State Highways, with a total length of  (1.3% of SH length). There were 13,726   of bridges in urban areas, also forming 1.3% of their length. 7,567 of them were single lane bridges. The 120 bridges on special-purpose roads formed only , or 0.7% of their length. The carbon footprint of the bridges was estimated to be 37.5 times that of their roads.

Some of the longest bridges on the state highway network are:

 Rakaia River bridge - 
 Auckland Harbour Bridge -  
 Thorndon Overbridges -  
 Whirokino Trestle Bridge -  
 Waitaki River Bridge -  
 Hokitika River Bridge -  
 Haast River Bridge -

Single lane bridges
New Zealand, due to its low traffic density, has had many single lane bridges. Some of those still exist on the state highway network and are criticised by road users. These are progressively replaced with two lane structures.

Viaducts

Newmarket Viaduct
Otira Viaduct
Percy Burn Viaduct
Victoria Park Viaduct
Mohaka Viaduct

Rail bridges

Road/rail bridges
There are two bridges on the State Highway on West Coast that have rail lines on the road carriageway. Until 2008 the Awatere River bridge had a rail line above the road way. A new road bridge has been constructed with the railway now being the sole use of the original bridge.

Two bridges on now-closed sections of the East Coast Main Trunk line are still in use by road-traffic only.
The single deck Pekatahi Bridge, which spans the Whakatane River near Taneatua carries State Highway Two and it used to carry the mothballed rails of the ECMT the tracks were removed in 2019. 
The rare double-deck road-rail bridge at Karangahake Gorge, which crosses the Ohinemuri River, still carries a local road on the lower level, whilst on the upper level, the railway has been replaced by a walkway.

Footbridges

Since there are numerous large rivers in New Zealand many footbridges have been constructed in the backcountry. During the 1950s many bridges were built, along with backcountry huts, to give hunters access to forested areas to cull introduced deer which had by that stage become a serious pest. Some of the bridges still remain but other have been washed away or replaced with new ones and are now often used due to the popularity of tramping (hiking).

Notable bridges

The Auckland Harbour Bridge spans the Waitemata Harbour in the largest city in New Zealand.
The Bridge to Nowhere is a concrete road bridge spanning the Mangapurua Stream in Whanganui National Park. It has no roads leading to it, but it is a popular tourist attraction, accessible by boat or kayak. It was built in a failed attempt to open up a remote forested area for farming.

Bridge disasters and incidents

Waikato bridge dynamiting 

On April 30, during the 1951 New Zealand waterfront dispute a rail bridge three miles from Huntly, on the Glen Afton branch line, was dynamited. Although the morning passenger train ran over the damaged bridge, it did not collapse. After regular railway line patrols were commenced, trains ran normally again the next day.

Tangiwai disaster
The Tangiwai disaster on 24 December 1953, was the worst rail accident in New Zealand. The rail bridge over the Whangaehu river at Tangiwai had been badly damaged by a lahar from Mount Ruapehu just minutes before a passenger train was due to cross it. 151 of the 285 passengers aboard the train were killed.

The Berrymans' bridge
In 1986 the New Zealand Army built the Te Rata Bridge as a training exercise on a private farm owned by the Berryman family. In 1994 a beekeeper visiting the farm was killed when the bridge collapsed as he drove over it. The incident caused a series of high-profile court cases.

Waiho Bridge

On 26 March 2019, the Waiho Bridge near Franz Josef Glacier collapsed, following near record levels of rain. It was rebuilt and reopened 18 days later on 13 April 2019.

See also
Transport in New Zealand

References